The Iberger Kugel is a 1,013 metre high mountain in the Allgäu, located seven kilometers southeast of Isny im Allgäu.

A transmitter on top of the mountain transmits the radio stations Radio 7 on FM 105.0 and Radio Seefunk on FM 103.9.

External links

Mountains of the Alps
Mountains and hills of Baden-Württemberg